Corymbophanes andersoni is a species of catfish in the family Loricariidae. It is native to South America, where it occurs in the Essequibo River basin, including the Potaro River and Kaieteur Falls. It is found in the main channel of rivers, in areas with a substrate of gravel or cobble. The species reaches 8.6 cm (3.4 inches) SL.

References 

Ancistrini
Catfish of South America
Fish described in 1909